Amarildo Zela (born 25 August 1972 in Tirana) is an Albanian football manager and retired football player, who played as an attacking midfielder. He is currently the head coach of SG Waidhofen/Ybbs.

He played two games for the Albania national football team in 1992 and in 1997.

Club career 
Zela has played in 5 different countries through his career, and playing for 14 different teams in the process. He started his footballing career with KF Partizani Tirana before moving to Germany with Oberliga Nord side VfL Osnabrück. His first experience abroad was only a short one as he only spent 6 months at the club before moving back to Albania with SK Tirana in January 1994. After a season and a half back in Albania Zela decided to move to Croatia and the 1.HNL for the first time with NK Neretva Metković. Zela then moved to HNK Šibenik the next season where he teamed up with former Partizani teammate Ylli Shehu. It took just 6 months before his next move, this time i was to another Croatian club NK Vukovar '91 During his time with NK Vukovar Zela won promotion twice and teamed up with fellow Albanian Fatmir Vata for the 1999–2000 season after they were promoted to the top division in Croatia. He scored 10 goals that season in the 1.HNL. After 5 seasons and 4 clubs in Croatia, Zela moved to Israel with second-tier side Hapoel Jerusalem F.C.

International career
He made his debut for Albania in a May 1992 FIFA World Cup qualification match away against the Republic of Ireland and earned a total of 2 caps, scoring no goals. His other international game was a June 1997 World Cup qualification match against Portugal.

Managerial and later career
After 3 championship titles, 110 championship appearances and 101 goals for Vorwärts Steyr, Zela hung up his boots and became manager for the club's reserve team for the 2009–2010 season. However, he returned to the pitch for the upcoming season, signing with Austrian club Union Weißkirchen and then ASKÖ Leonding in the summer 2011 at the age of 38. However, only one month later, he became manager of Union Pregarten.

On 25 September 2012, Zela was appointed manager of WSC Hertha Wels. In the summer 2014, Zela returned SK Vorwärts Steyr, once again as a player-manager for the club's reserve team.

In May 2017, 44-year-old Zela made comeback at the pitch for ASV Kleinreifling. Zela became in charge of Austrian lower league side ASKÖ Steinbach Schwertberg in 2017 but left the club in July 2019. He then took the reins at FC Wels.

In the summer 2020, Zela became the head coach of SG Waidhofen/Ybbs.

Honours
Albanian Superliga: 2
 1993, 1995

References

External links 
 
 
 Profile at Hrrepka
 Amarildo Zela at ÖFB

1972 births
Living people
Footballers from Tirana
Albanian footballers
Association football midfielders
Albania international footballers
FK Partizani Tirana players
VfL Osnabrück players
KF Tirana players
NK Neretva players
HNK Šibenik players
NK Marsonia players
HNK Vukovar '91 players
Hapoel Be'er Sheva F.C. players
Hapoel Jerusalem F.C. players
NK Kamen Ingrad players
NK Čakovec players
DSV Leoben players
SK Vorwärts Steyr players
FC Blau-Weiß Linz players
Kategoria Superiore players
Croatian Football League players
First Football League (Croatia) players
Israeli Premier League players
2. Liga (Austria) players
Albanian expatriate footballers
Expatriate footballers in Germany
Albanian expatriate sportspeople in Germany
Expatriate footballers in Croatia
Albanian expatriate sportspeople in Croatia
Expatriate footballers in Israel
Albanian expatriate sportspeople in Israel
Expatriate footballers in Austria
Albanian expatriate sportspeople in Austria
Albanian football managers
Albanian expatriate football managers
Expatriate football managers in Austria